Kaiy (Kai, Taori-Kei) is a Lakes Plain language of Papua, Indonesia. It is spoken in Kaiy and Kokou villages in Rafaer District, Mamberamo Raya Regency.

References

Lakes Plain languages
Languages of western New Guinea